Gajpanth (also spelled Gajpantha) is a Digambar Jain pilgrimage site (Siddha-kshetra) located in Mhasrul village, in the Nashik district of the Indian state of Maharashtra.
It's managed and maintained by Registered Trust No. A-193/NSK.

Geography
The pilgrimage is located in the Indian state of Maharashtra. The pilgrimage site is accessible via a staircase built in black stone, which leads directly to the temple. The hill has 450 steps, three caves (known as chamar leni), and several temples belonging to the Digambara sect of the Jains. There is also a sculpture depicting samavasarana (divine preaching hall of tirthankara) on the hills of Gajpanth.

History
Gajpanth is said to be the salvation place of seven Balabhadra (heroes) of the Jain Universal history, known as Vijay, Achal, Sudharma, Suprabh, Nandi, Nandimitra and Sudarshan. It is believed that the saints took eight crores (80 million) of Yadav kings with them from this location to salvation, and that many Jain monks (or sadhus) attained moksha from this hill.

See also

 Mangi-Tungi
 Ramtek Jain temple

References

Jain pilgrimage sites
Jain temples in Maharashtra
Tourist attractions in Nashik district